The 3rd Metro Manila Film Festival was held in the year 1977. Previously known as the Metropolitan Film Festival and Filipino Film Festival, it was changed to Metro Manila Film Festival. A total of nine movies directed by the Philippines' great filmmakers participated in the 1977 Metro Manila Film Festival.

In this year, only two films were awarded. Ian Film Productions' Burlesk Queen, the top grosser of the 10-day festival, romped away with most of the awards. It won seven major awards including the Best Film, Best Actress for Vilma Santos, Best Actor for Rolly Quizon, and more. Pera Films' Mga Bilanggong Birhen won two awards: Best Cinematography for Romy Vitug and Best Art Direction for Laida Lim-Perez.

Entries

Awards
Winners are listed first and highlighted in boldface.

Multiple awards

Ceremony Information

Controversies
Director Lino Brocka walked out of the awarding ceremonies at the Metropolitan Theater when Celso Ad. Castillo's Burlesk Queen starring Vilma Santos won eight of the ten awards including the Best Picture award. Mr. Brocka reportedly threw invectives at Rolando Tinio, who was the chairman of the panel of judges of the festival. It was also reported that organizers asked the winners to return their medals (the MMFF handed out medals that year) due to the controversy. However, this turned out to be just a malicious rumor as all winners still have their awards to this day.

References

External links
Metro Manila Film Festival: Awards for 1977 at the Internet Movie Database

Metro Manila Film Festival
1977 MMFF
MMFF
MMFF